During the early hours of October 31, 2020, United States Navy SEALs from the Naval Special Warfare Development Group (DEVGRU), parachuted from Air Force Special Operations aircraft of the 352d Special Operations Wing, and conducted an operation in Northern Nigeria, resulting in the rescue of an American hostage and the killing of six of the seven captors. The hostage, 27-year-old Philip Walton, had been kidnapped in front of his family at his home in the village of Massalata in neighboring Niger on 26 October by armed gunmen, who intended to sell him to armed terrorist groups in the area.

Background 
In 2020, Niger experienced a multitude of attacks by extremists linked to both Islamic State (IS) groups and Al-Qaeda. About two months prior to the kidnapping of Walton, IS-linked militants killed six French aid workers and their Niger guide while they were visiting a wildlife park near the capital Niamey. Additionally American aid worker Jeffery Woodke was kidnapped from Abalak in October 2016, and is believed to be held in Mali.

Philip Walton is an American citizen and the son of missionaries, who has lived in Massalata with his wife and child for two years. His father lives in Birni-N'konni, and has lived in Niger for about 30 years.

Kidnapping and rescue 
Walton was kidnapped by six men armed with Kalashnikovs, from his farm in Massalata in southern Niger in the early morning of 27 October 2020. The kidnappers initially demanded money from Walton, but abducted him after he was only able to offer US$40. The kidnappers then demanded a US$1 million ransom from Walton's father via a phone call.

The Nigerien Interior Ministry announced the incident via a statement read on national radio, which claimed that the kidnappers had searched Walton's home before fleeing with him. The country sent additional security reinforcements to the area and began efforts with the United States to secure the release of Walton.

On 31 October 2020, operators from the Naval Special Warfare Development Group, known as SEAL Team Six, rescued Philip Walton in a night-time raid, killing six of seven gunmen. The rescue force, consisting of around 30 operators, was inserted into the area via parachute from Air Force Special Operations aircraft. After a short but intense firefight, Walton was moved to an extraction point, where he and the rescue force were flown out of the area.

The rescue operation involved the governments of Niger and Nigeria working together with the United States. According to a former U.S. official speaking on the operation, the CIA provided intelligence on Walton's location and that elements of Marine Special Operations Command helped locate him.

Officials from the US Department of Defense and US Department of State have not linked the kidnappers to any terrorist organization.

Aircraft involved
The Navy SEALs were flown to and out of the area via CV-22B and MC-130J Commando II special operations aircraft, with one AC-130J Ghostrider gunship to provide air support. The aircraft belonged to the 352d Special Operations Wing, which were supported by five KC-135 Stratotankers of the 100th Air Refueling Wing, both based out of RAF Mildenhall. One Navy P-8A Poseidon maritime patrol plane also took part in the operation.

Reaction
A statement put out by Pentagon chief spokesperson Jonathan Hoffman stated “U.S. forces conducted a hostage rescue operation during the early hours of 31 October in Northern Nigeria to recover an American citizen held hostage by a group of armed men. This American citizen is safe and is now in the care of the U.S. Department of State. No U.S military personnel were injured during the operation. We appreciate the support of our international partners in conducting this operation."

US President Donald Trump hailed the operation and the rescue team on Twitter, where he said that the operation was a "big win for our very elite U.S. Special Forces" and added "[...] we got our young man back." Trump also referenced the rescue at a campaign speech in Pennsylvania stating; "The kidnappers wished they had never done it." and "...we got our young man back."

Meanwhile, US Secretary of State Mike Pompeo described the operation as "outstanding." White House Press Secretary Kayleigh McEnany spoke on Fox & Friends about the rescue and stated that the president prioritizes the safety of American citizens. In 2021 reporting, The New Yorker claimed that Mike Pompeo was initially hesitant to provide support to the mission.

See also
Rescue of Jessica Buchanan and Poul Hagen Thisted
Bulo Marer hostage rescue attempt
Burkina Faso hostage rescue
Sokoto hostage rescue attempt

References 

2020 in Niger
2020 in Nigeria
Counterterrorism in Nigeria
Hostage rescue operations
October 2020 events in Nigeria
Military operations involving the United States
SEAL Team Six